Cork South-Central is a parliamentary constituency represented in Dáil Éireann, the lower house of the Irish parliament or Oireachtas. The constituency elects 4 deputies (Teachtaí Dála, commonly known as TDs) on the system of proportional representation by means of the single transferable vote (PR-STV).

History and boundaries
The constituency was created under the Electoral (Amendment) Act 1980 and first used at the 1981 general election, taking in parts of the former Cork City and Cork Mid constituencies. It is a mixed urban-rural constituency encompassing the south of Cork City, county towns and a rural hinterland. It encompasses the electoral areas of Cork City south of the river Lee, together with most of the Carrigaline electoral area of County Cork, including the Ringaskiddy and Passage West areas.

TDs

Elections

2020 general election

2016 general election

2011 general election

2007 general election

2002 general election

1998 by-election
Following the death of Fine Gael TD Hugh Coveney, a by-election was held on 23 October 1998. It was won by the Fine Gael candidate Simon Coveney, son of the deceased TD.

1997 general election

1994 by-election
Following the resignation of Progressive Democrats TD Pat Cox after his election to the European Parliament, a by-election was held on 10 November 1994. It was won by the Fine Gael candidate Hugh Coveney.

1992 general election

1989 general election

1987 general election

November 1982 general election

February 1982 general election

1981 general election

See also
Dáil constituencies
Elections in the Republic of Ireland
Politics of the Republic of Ireland
List of Dáil by-elections
List of political parties in the Republic of Ireland

References

External links
 Oireachtas Constituency Dashboards
 Oireachtas Members Database

Dáil constituencies
Politics of County Cork
Politics of Cork (city)
1981 establishments in Ireland
Constituencies established in 1981